Rebecca (Becky) Druhan is a Canadian politician, who was elected to the Nova Scotia House of Assembly in the 2021 Nova Scotia general election. She represents the riding of Lunenburg West as a member of the Progressive Conservative Association of Nova Scotia.

Education
Druhan graduated from Dalhousie University in 1997 with a Bachelor of Arts degree. In 2003, she received a Bachelor of Laws from Dalhousie Law School and was admitted to the bar in 2004.

Career
Prior to her election to the legislature, Druhan was a lawyer and program coordinator for the Victorian Order of Nurses.

Druhan was sworn in as the minister for Education and Early Childhood Development on August 31, 2021.

References

Year of birth missing (living people)
Living people
Progressive Conservative Association of Nova Scotia MLAs
Women MLAs in Nova Scotia
Members of the Executive Council of Nova Scotia
21st-century Canadian politicians
21st-century Canadian women politicians